Nueve (English: Nine) (stylized Nu9ve) is a Mexican free-to-air television network owned by TelevisaUnivision. The primary station and network namesake is Channel 9 of Mexico City (also known by its call sign XEQ-TDT), though the network has nationwide coverage on Televisa stations and some affiliates. Nueve offers a range of general entertainment programs.

History

The roots of Nueve go back to the foundation of Televisión Independiente de México, the first serious contender to Telesistema Mexicano. In 1973, the two companies merged to form Televisión Vía Satélite, better known as Televisa (now known as TelevisaUnivision Mexico).

After years of broadcasting primarily cultural programs, channel 9 in Mexico City returned to commercial programming in the mid-1990s, under the name Galavisión. This Galavisión was unrelated to the American cable channel of the same name.

In April 2013, Galavisión changed its name to Gala TV.

Gala TV programs were traditionally carried on a number of Televisa-affiliated local stations. In 2017, Televisa ended a significant number of these partnerships and began multiplexing Gala TV on various Canal 5 transmitters in larger markets.

On July 9, 2018, the network relaunched as Nueve, with a new programming lineup. The branding reflects the fact that its Mexico City station XEQ-TDT and most of its retransmitters broadcast on virtual channel 9.

Programming

The Nueve schedule features mainly reruns of major Mexican telenovelas, reruns of TelevisaUnivision Mexico series, as well as soccer and lucha libre and old Mexican movies. On March 18, 2008, it was announced that an agreement was made between Televisa and NBCUniversal that Galavisión would broadcast Telemundo programs on Galavisión as well as on selected channels of SKY México and Cablevision beginning in April 2008.

As part of the Nueve relaunch, Televisa signed deals with Discovery and National Geographic to air their content. The relaunch also included a new entertainment program, Intrusos, hosted by entertainment journalist Juan José Origel.

Movies
Cine Sensacional (Weekends)
GalaCinema (Weekdays 6:00PM–8:00PM)
La Nueva Era (Weekends)

Stations
Nueve is not nominally a national network; unlike Las Estrellas or Canal 5, it does not meet the national coverage threshold necessary to be considered one by the Federal Telecommunications Institute.

There is significant variance in the programming schedules of Nueve and its stations, not seen with Las Estrellas or Canal 5.

Some stations are full-time repeaters, usually broadcasting on channel 9.1, clearing all Nueve programming while only inserting local advertising. Others also carry FOROtv, Televisa Regional, and/or local programs.

There are also several Nueve feeds multiplexed on (primarily) Canal 5 transmitters, which carry Nueve programming full-time. Some of these subchannels may also have local programming.

Not all Mexican stations using virtual channel 9 are part of the Nueve network. In some cases, these stations block Nu9ve from using channel 9 in those areas. Most notably, the list includes CORTV in Oaxaca, XHUJED-TDT in Durango and XHSLS-TDT in San Luis Potosí. Televisa also owns Las Estrellas transmitter XERV-TDT in Reynosa, Tamaulipas, which has assigned channel 9. The stations in Tijuana, Mexicali and Ciudad Juárez cannot use virtual channel 9 because of signal overlap to stations in the United States using it.

|-

|-

|-

|-

|-

|-

|-

|-

|-

|-

|-

|-

|-

|-

|-

|-

|-

|-

|-

|-

|-

|-

|-

|-

|-

|-

|-

|-

|-

|-

|-

|-

|-

|-

|-

|-

|-

|-

|-

|-

|-

|-

|-

|-

|-

|-

Notes

External links 
 Nu9ve official website

References

 
Television channels and stations established in 1968
Television networks in Mexico
Televisa broadcast television networks
Mass media in Mexico City
1968 establishments in Mexico